CubeSat for Solar Particles (CuSP) was a low-cost 6U CubeSat to orbit the Sun to study the dynamic particles and magnetic fields. The principal investigator for CuSP is Mihir Desai, at the Southwest Research Institute (SwRI) in San Antonio, Texas. It was launched on the maiden flight of the Space Launch System (SLS), as a secondary payload of the Artemis 1 mission on 16 November 2022. 

Following deployment from the Artemis launch adaptor, contact with the spacecraft showed that it successfully stabilized and deployed its solar arrays, but after the initial 57 minute 27 second radio contact, no further contact was established, however the search is still on. Blind commanding will be performed to stabilize the spacecraft should it still be functioning.

Objective 
Measuring space weather that can create a wide variety of effects at Earth, from interfering with radio communications to tripping up satellite electronics to creating electric currents in power grids, is of importance. To create a network of space weather stations would require many instruments scattered throughout space millions of miles apart, but the cost of such a system is prohibitive. Though the CubeSats can only carry a few instruments, they are relatively inexpensive to launch because of their small mass and standardized design. Thus, CuSP also was intended as a test for creating a network of space science stations.

The CuSP Team 
CuSP Spacecraft Team:

Dr. Mihir Desai: Principal Investigator

Mike Epperly: Project Manager

Dr. Don George: Mission System Engineer

Chad Loeffler: Flight Software Engineer

Raymond Doty: Spacecraft Technician

Dr. Frederic Allegrini: SIS Instrument Lead

Dr. Neil Murphy: VHM Instrument Lead

Dr. Shrikanth Kanekal, MERiT Instrument Lead

Payload 
This CubeSat carried three scientific instruments:
 The Suprathermal Ion Spectrograph (SIS), is built by the Southwest Research Institute to detect and characterize low-energy solar energetic particles. 
 Miniaturized Electron and Proton Telescope (MERiT), is built by the NASA's Goddard Space Flight Center and will return counts of high-energy solar energetic particles.
 Vector Helium Magnetometer (VHM), being built by NASA's Jet Propulsion Laboratory, will measure the strength and direction of magnetic fields.

Propulsion
The satellite features a cold gas thruster system for propulsion, attitude control (orientation) and orbital maneuvering.

CuSP Spacecraft Bus 
The CuSP CubeSat Spacecraft Bus consisted of:

 SwRI Spacecraft Integrator: Design, Assembly, Integration and Test
 SwRI SATYR Command and Data Handling Unit
 SwRI Flight Software
 Clyde-Space AAC Electrical Power System 
 BCR MPPT converters
 LiPo Batteries and 
 Deployable and Fixed Solar Arrays
 VACCO MiPS Cold Gas Thruster
 Blue Canyon Technologies XACT ADCS with Integrated Thruster Control
 SwRI Spacecraft Structure Mechanical and Thermal (SMT)
 NASA JPL/SDL IRIS X-Band Deep Space Transponder
 NASA GSFC Mission Operations Center
 NASA Deep Space Network Ground Communication

Flight results 
After a successful launch of the SLS at 12:47 am ET, The Orion/ICPS performed a Trans-Lunar Injection and separated.  Shortly thereafter, CuSP was deployed from its launch canister.  Twenty-three minutes after deployment, DSN received Open Loop Receiver (OLR) telemetry from CuSP indicating it had booted up, detumbled, deployed solar arrays, and assumed a SAFE, Sun-pointing, orientation. Multiple attempts to receive signals from the spacecraft failed, and no further contact has been made. The CuSP team has fully investigated a sudden battery temperature increase and found it was a telemetry failure.  This was verified by comparing redundant indications of several parameters. The redundant indications did not show the suspected excursion.  The CuSP team has fully investigated an anomalous high radio temperature and found it to only be a GSE scaling problem.  OLR monitoring of the radio signal indicated that the transmitter stopped suddenly after transmitting for 1 hour and 15 minutes. No cause has been determined for this end of transmission.  Additional contact attempts are planned during the first quarter of 2023.

Gallery

See also 
The 10 CubeSats flying in the Artemis 1 mission
 Near-Earth Asteroid Scout by NASA was a solar sail spacecraft that was planned to encounter a near-Earth asteroid (mission failure)
 BioSentinel is an astrobiology mission
 LunIR by Lockheed Martin Space
 Lunar IceCube, by the Morehead State University
 CubeSat for Solar Particles (CuSP)
 Lunar Polar Hydrogen Mapper (LunaH-Map), designed by the Arizona State University
 EQUULEUS, submitted by JAXA and the University of Tokyo
 OMOTENASHI, submitted by JAXA, was a lunar lander (mission failure)
 Cislunar Explorers, Cornell University, Ithaca, New York
 Earth Escape Explorer (CU-E3), University of Colorado Boulder

References 

CubeSats
NASA space probes
Missions to the Sun
Spacecraft launched in 2022
2022 in the United States
Secondary payloads